Owston Islands is a group of small islands lying 1 nautical mile (1.9 km) west of Darbel Islands in Crystal Sound. Mapped from surveys by Falkland Islands Dependencies Survey (FIDS) (1958–59). Named by United Kingdom Antarctic Place-Names Committee (UK-APC) for P. G. Owston, British crystallographer who has interpreted x-ray diffraction work on ice in terms of structure and movement of molecules.

See also 
 List of Antarctic and sub-Antarctic islands

Islands of Graham Land
Graham Coast